Audun Sjøstrand (born 11 April 1950) is a Norwegian journalist, teacher and crime fiction writer.

Sjøstrand was born in Radøy. He has been a journalist for the newspaper Gula Tidend, and taught in secondary schools. He made his literary debut in 1985 with the novel Hundemordet. Further novels are Ureint trav from 1987 and Valsekongens fall from 1991. He was awarded the Melsom Prize in 1986, and the Riverton Prize for 1991.

References

1950 births
Living people
People from Radøy
University of Bergen alumni
Norwegian journalists
Norwegian schoolteachers
Norwegian male novelists
Norwegian crime fiction writers
20th-century Norwegian novelists
Nynorsk-language writers
20th-century Norwegian male writers